Roxana Daniela Szölösi (née Rob; born 29 May 1992) is a Romanian handball player who plays for Minaur Baia Mare.

International honours  
EHF Cup:
Finalist: 2012

References
 

  
1992 births
Living people
Sportspeople from Baia Mare
Romanian female handball players